The 66th Missile Squadron is an inactive United States Air Force unit.  It was last assigned to the 44th Operations Group, stationed at Ellsworth Air Force Base, South Dakota.  The 66th was equipped with the LGM-30F Minuteman II Intercontinental ballistic missile, with a mission of nuclear deterrence.   With the end of the Cold War, the 66th was inactivated on 1 September 1993.

History

World War II
The squadron was first activated in January 1941 as the 66th Bombardment Squadron at MacDill Field, Florida  as one of the original squadrons of the 44th Bombardment Group.  The squadron was equipped with Consolidated B-24 Liberators.  Following the Japanese attack on Pearl Harbor, the squadron began to participate in antisubmarine patrols.  Although the squadron briefly became an Operational Training Unit in February 1942, it began intensive training for deployment to the European Theater of Operations in July.

Deployed to the European Theater of Operations, being assigned to VIII Bomber Command in England during the summer of 1942.  One of the first B-24 Liberator units assigned to the England. The squadron flew long range strategic bombardment missions over Occupied Europe and Germany, attacking strategic targets in France, Belgium, the Netherlands and Germany. Among the targets attacked were submarine installations, industrial establishments, airfields, harbors, shipyards, and other objectives.

A detachment deployed to Twelfth Air Force in Algeria in June 1943. It helped facilitate the Allied invasion of Sicily by bombing airfields and marshalling yards in Italy. It also participated in the famous low-level raid on the Ploiești oil fields in Romania on 1 August 1943.  Most of the detachment returned to England at the end of August, however some crews and aircraft remained in the Mediterranean Theater of Operations (MTO) and flew very long range attacks over Italy, Romania, Austria, and Sicily and supported Allied ground forces in Sicily as well as attacking Axis forces in Italy supporting the Salerno Invasion of Italy.  All aircraft and personnel returned to England in October.

Returned to VIII Bomber Command operations, and supported the Allied Invasion of France in June 1944 by attacking strong points in the beachhead area and transportation targets behind the front lines. The group aided the Caen offensive and the Saint-Lô breakthrough in July. Dropped food, ammunition, and other supplies to troops engaged in the airborne attack on the Netherlands in September. Attacked enemy targets during the Battle of the Bulge, December 1944-January 1945, by striking bridges, tunnels, choke points, rail and road junctions, and communications in the battle area. The squadron attacked airfields and transportation in support of the Western Allied Invasion of Germany, and flew a resupply mission during the airborne assault across the Rhine in March 1945.    Combat operations concluded with the German Capitulation in May 1945.

Returned to the United States in June 1945, being reassigned to Second Air Force and reorganized as a Boeing B-29 Superfortress very heavy bombardment squadron.   Trained with B-29s and planned to deploy to the Western Pacific, however the Japanese Capitulation in August canceled deployment plans.   Stationed in Kansas as part of Continental Air Forces (later Strategic Air Command) but inactivated in July 1946 as part of the general demobilization of the AAF.

Strategic Air Command
Reactivated in 1947 under SAC as a paper unit; not manned or equipped and inactivated in 1949 due to budget constraints.

Reactivated in 1950 and used as an Operational Training Unit for B-29 aircrews and maintenance personnel being deployed to for Far East Air Forces during the Korean War.  Replaced the propeller-driven B-29s with new Boeing B-47E Stratojet swept-wing medium bombers in 1953, capable of flying at high subsonic speeds and primarily designed for penetrating the airspace of the Soviet Union. In the late 1950s, the B-47 was considered to be reaching obsolescence, and was being phased out of SAC's strategic arsenal. Began sending aircraft to other B-47 wings as replacements in late 1959, being phased down for inactivation in 1960.

Intercontinental Ballistic Missile Squadron
66th Missile Squadron Launch Facilities
Reactivated in 1962 as a SAC ICBM missile squadron.  Trained with the 850th Strategic Missile Squadron in HGM-25A Titan I operations in 1962, being made operational with LGM-30B Minuteman I missiles in 1963.  Upgraded to the LGM-30F Minuteman II in 1972.  Remained on Cold War nuclear alert until in response to President Bush's directive to stand down the Minuteman II.  Dissipated launch codes and pin safety control switches at 15 launch control facilities.  Deactivation of the entire missile complex ended in the summer of 1993; squadron inactivated on 1 September.

 Missile Alert Facilities (A-E flights, each controlling 10 missiles) are located as follows:
 A-01 19.9 mi S of Howes, SD, 
 B-01 7.5 mi NxNW of Wall SD, 
 C-01 10.1 mi N of Philip SD, 
 D-01 6.7 mi SxSW of Cottonwood SD,  
 E-01 6.3 mi NxNE of Kadoka SD,

Lineage
 Constituted as the 66th Bombardment Squadron (Heavy) on 20 November 1940
 Activated on 15 Jan 1941
 Redesignated 66th Bombardment Squadron, Heavy on 20 August 1943
 Redesignated 66th Bombardment Squadron, Very Heavy on 5 August 1945
 Inactivated on 12 July 1946
 Activated on 1 July 1947
 Inactivated on 6 September 1948
 Redesignated 66th Bombardment Squadron, Medium on 20 December 1950
 Activated on 2 January 1951
 Discontinued on 15 June 1960
 Redesignated 66th Strategic Missile Squadron on 19 March 1962
 Organized on 1 July 1962
 Redesignated 66th Missile Squadron on 1 September 1991
 Inactivated on 1 September 1993

Assignments
 44th Bombardment Group, 15 January 1941 – 12 July 1946
 44th Bombardment Group, 1 July 1947 – 6 September 1948
 44th Bombardment Group, 2 January 1951 (attached to 44th Bombardment Wing after 10 February 1951)
 44th Bombardment Wing, 16 June 1952
 Department of the Air Force, 15 June 1960 (not organized)
 Strategic Air Command, 19 March 1962 (not organized)
 44th Strategic Missile Wing, 1 July 1962
 44th Operations Group, 1 September 1991 – 1 September 1993

Stations

 MacDill Field, Florida, 15 January 1941
 Barksdale Field, Louisiana, 9 February 1942
 Will Rogers Field, Oklahoma, 26 July-25 August 1942
 RAF Cheddington (Station 113), England, 12 September 1942
 RAF Shipdham (Station 115), England, 10 October 1942 – c. 15 June 1945
 Sioux Falls Army Air Field, South Dakota, 26 June 1945

 Great Bend Army Air Field, Kansas, 24 July 1945
 Smoky Hill Army Air Field, Kansas, c. 12 October 1945 – 12 July 1946
 Andrews Field (later Andrews Air Force Base), Maryland, 1 July 1947 – 6 September 1948
 March Air Force Base, California, 2 January 1951
 Lake Charles Air Force Base (later Chenault Air Force Base), Louisiana, 1 August 1951 – 15 June 1960
 Ellsworth Air Force Base, South Dakota, 1 September 1962 – 1 September 1993

Aircraft and missiles
 Consolidated B-24 Liberator, 1941–1945
 Boeing B-29 Superfortress, 1945–1946; 1951–1952
 Boeing TB-29 Superfortress, 1951
 Boeing B-47 Stratojet, 1953–1960
 LGM-30B Minuteman I, 1963–1973
 LGM-30F Minuteman II, 1972–1993

See also

Minuteman Missile National Historic Site - one of the squadron's launch control facilities and launch facilities left over from the Cold War.
 List of United States Air Force missile squadrons

References

Bibliography

External links
 Ellsworth AFB Minuteman Missile Site Coordinates

066
Military units and formations in South Dakota